Tiger Shaw may refer to:

 Jock Shaw (1912–2000), nicknamed Tiger, Scottish footballer
 Tiger Shaw (alpine skier) (born 1961), former American alpine ski racer